The 1937 Railway Cup Hurling Championship was the 11th staging of the Railway Cup since its establishment by the Gaelic Athletic Association in 1927. The cup began on 14 February 1937 and ended on 17 March 1937.

Leinster were the defending champions.

On 17 March 1937, Munster won the cup following a 1-09 to 3-01 defeat of Leinster in the final at Croke Park. This was their sixth Railway Cup title overall and their first title since 1934.

Results

Semi-final

Final

Sources

 Donegan, Des, The Complete Handbook of Gaelic Games (DBA Publications Limited, 2005).

References

Railway Cup Hurling Championship
Railway Cup Hurling Championship